Masked Prowler, The Story of a Raccoon (1950) is a children's novel written by John and  Jean George and illustrated by Jean George, more famously known by her later novels as Jean Craighead George.

This is the chronicle of Procyon, from his birth, mother's lessons, and adventures with his littermates, to his solitary adolescence, mating, hibernation, and encounters with humans. The humans are secondary characters, mainly Minnesota farmers, hunters, and storytellers, who help put Procyon's history in perspective. Even more so than with their first novel, Vulpes, the Red Fox, the Georges do not present an anthropomorphic world; the names of the animal characters are taken from their Latin scientific names: e.g., the raccoon is Procyon lotor, and Procyon's mate here is named Lotor. Only the humans are given moral traits (the good farmer Gib and his hired hand, Joe, vs. the Luke brothers who hunt animals out of season); the animals are presented realistically, without sentimentality, simply struggling to survive. As such, it is an early example of true ecological fiction.

1950 American novels
American children's novels
Fictional raccoons
Children's novels about animals
E. P. Dutton books
1950 children's books